Hiligaynon literature consists of both the oral and written works in Hiligaynon, the language of the Hiligaynon people in the Philippine regions of Western Visayas and  Soccsksargen.

History

Notable works
Religio Cristiano Apostolica Romana – the first book entirely written in Hiligaynon, authored by Mariano Cuartero
Ang Babai nga Huaran – possibly first modern Hiligaynon play and the first modern play overall in any Philippine language, written by Cornelio Hilado in either 1878 or 1894
Quinabuhi kag Pasion ni Hesukristo nga Aton Ginoo (1884) – written by Mariano Perfecto
Ang Mutia nga Matin-aw (1894) – a play written by Eriberto Gumban
Ang Capitan (1903) – the first Hiligaynon zarzuela to be performed, written by Valente "Valentin" Cristobal and composed by Juan Paterno
Ang Nagahigugma sa Iya Duta (1906) – the first Hiligaynon zarzuela to be written (in 1899), with its libretto by Salvador Ciocon
Benjamin (1907) – the first Hiligaynon novel, written by Angel Magahum Sr. in 1894
Nating (1908) – a zarzuela written by Valentín Cristóbal and composed by Teodoro Gallego
"Sa Dalagang Ilong-Ilonganon" (1926) – a poem by Flavio Zaragoza y Cano
Mga Hinugpong nga Malip-ut nga Sugilanon (1935) – an anthology of short stories by Angel Magahum Sr.
"De Mactan a Tirad" (1940) – a poem by Flavio Zaragoza y Cano
Margosatubig: Maragtas ni Salagunting (1946) – a novel by Ramon Muzones
Juanita Cruz (1968) – a novel by Magdalena Jalandoni
Lirio (1998) – an award-winning short story by Peter Solis Nery
Ang Pangayaw (2000) – an award-winning short story by Peter Solis Nery 
Ang Kapid (2006) – an award-winning short story by Peter Solis Nery
Candido (2007) – an award-winning short story by Peter Solis Nery
Donato Bugtot (2011) – an award-winning short story by Peter Solis Nery
Si Padre Olan kag ang Dios (2013) – an award-winning short story by Peter Solis Nery
Ang Milagro sa Ermita (2017) – an award-winning short story by Peter Solis Nery

Notable Hiligaynon writers
Antonio Ledesma Jayme (1854–1937) – lawyer, revolutionary, provincial governor and assemblyman. Born in Jaro, Iloilo City, lived in Bacolod
Graciano López Jaena (1856–1896) – journalist, orator, and revolutionary from Iloilo, well known for his written works in La Solidaridad and the satirical story Fray Botod. Born in Jaro, Iloilo City
Angel Magahum Sr. (1867–1931) – writer, editor and composer. Composed the classic Iloilo ang Banwa Ko, the unofficial song of Iloilo. Born in Molo, Iloilo City
Valente Cristóbal (1875–1945) – Hiligaynon playwright. Born in Polo (now Valenzuela City), Bulacan
Magdalena Jalandoni (1891–1978) – prolific writer, novelist and feminist. Born in Jaro, Iloilo City
Flavio Zaragoza y Cano (1892–1965) – lawyer, journalist and the "Prince of Visayan poets". Born in Cabatuan, Iloilo
Ramon Muzones (1913–1992) – novelist, poet, and essayist. Born in Miagao, Iloilo City
Conrado Saquian Norada (born 1921) – lawyer, intelligence officer and governor of Iloilo from 1969 to 1986. Co-founder and editor of Yuhum magazine. Born in Miagao, Iloilo City
Peter Solis Nery (born 1969) – prolific writer, poet, playwright, novelist, editor, "Hari sang Binalaybay", and champion of the Hiligaynon language. Born in Dumangas, Iloilo
Elizabeth Batiduan Navarro – Hiligaynon drama writer for radio programs of Bombo Radyo Philippines

See also
Hiligaynon language
Philippine literature

References

Philippine literature
Hiligaynon language
Visayan literature